Napatree Point in Rhode Island, often referred to simply as Napatree, is a long sandy spit created by a geologic process called longshore drift. Up until the Hurricane of 1938, Napatree was sickle-shaped and included a 1.5-mile (2.4 km) long northern extension called Sandy Point. Napatree now extends 1.5 miles (2.4 km) westward from the business district of Watch Hill, a village in Westerly, Rhode Island forming a protected harbor. It is the southernmost and westernmost point of mainland Rhode Island.

Name origin 
Reportedly, the name "Napatree" derives from Nap or Nape (Neck) of Trees. Napatree Point was once heavily wooded. However, when the Great September Gale of 1815 struck the area, the trees were destroyed.

Geography and geology 

Napatree Point is a slender, 1.5 mile long peninsula in Block Island Sound. To the north of the peninsula is Little Narragansett Bay, a small estuary into which the Pawcatuck River empties. The small bay is an inlet of the Atlantic Ocean.

The peninsula is partially made from longshore drift. It is also made from glacial moraine, and is similar in makeup to nearby Fishers Island. The same moraine that Fishers Island is made out of resurfaces in Watch Hill, the village which contains Napatree Point. This region of the Northeastern United States made by glacial moraines from the Wisconsonian glaciation is known as the Outer Lands.

History 

In 1898, the federal government purchased  at the elbow of Napatree Point for the construction of a coastal artillery installation, one of many such forts designed to protect the eastern entrance to Long Island Sound as part of a defense network for New York City. Fort Mansfield began operations in 1901. However, war games in 1907 demonstrated a fatal design flaw, and by 1909 it was removed from the list of active posts.

In 1926, the government put the land up for sale. A New York developer proposed Sandy Point be subdivided in 674 lots. A private syndicate of Watch Hill residents mobilized to prevent the construction of "cheap little houses" and protect the exclusive character of their town. The purchase was finalized in 1928, and all government buildings at Fort Mansfield were demolished that winter. Today, all that remains are the three concrete gun emplacements, which were left behind. The syndicate was unable to meet mortgage payments and in 1931 the land was foreclosed upon by the Washington Trust Company.

The Hurricane of 1938 caught New England by surprise. Forty-two people were in their Fort Road homes on Napatree when the hurricane struck, and 15 died. The storm demolished all the homes built on Napatree as well as one of the Fort Mansfield gun emplacements. It created several breachways in the spit. The first of these breachways was near the current beach club bathhouses. At least three more broke the connection between Sandy Point and Napatree Point, severing it from the mainland. Sandy Point is now an island in Little Narragansett Bay. Combined with the 1938 hurricane, erosion by the sea has caused the Napatree beach line to retreat some 200 feet since the mid-1930s.

In 1940, the Sandy Point portion was deeded to Alfred Guildersleeve of Stonington, Connecticut. In 1945, the remainder of the land was sold to the Watch Hill Fire District for $10,000.

Present-day conservation 
Napatree Point is now a wildlife preserve and a popular public beach protected by the Watch Hill Conservancy and Fire District, which have hired wardens to protect the area's wildlife and habitat. These wardens work with the U.S. Fish and Wildlife Service to protect the piping plover, a federally endangered species. Napatree is also home to deer, fox, ospreys and a resting area for migratory birds.

References

External links 

The Watch Hill Conservancy
Aerial view of Napatree Point (bottom) and Sandy Point (top left), as they now exist after the 1938 hurricane split the peninsula in two

Nature reserves in Rhode Island
Landforms of Washington County, Rhode Island
Westerly, Rhode Island
Spits of the United States
Protected areas of Washington County, Rhode Island